The Prophet: The Best of the Works is an album by American rapper 2Pac, released in 2003 by Death Row Records. The album includes several songs from All Eyez on Me, The Don Killuminati: The 7 Day Theory and Thug Life: Volume 1.

Track listing

Only God Can Judge Me, Tradin' War Stories, Skandalouz, 2 of Amerikaz Most Wanted, California Love & All Eyez On Me, all originally appeared in All Eyez On Me.
Just Like Daddy, Me & My Girlfriend, Against All Odds, To Live & Die in L.A. & Life Of An Outlaw, all originally appeared in The Don Killuminati: The 7 Day Theory.
Pour Out A Little Liquor, originally appeared on the Above The Rim soundtrack.
Wanted Dead Or Alive, originally appeared on the Gridlock'd soundtrack.
Staring Through My Rear View, original appeared on the Gang Related soundtrack.

Charts

References

Compilation albums published posthumously
2003 greatest hits albums
Tupac Shakur compilation albums
Death Row Records compilation albums